Ahmet Kenan Evren (17 July 1917 – 9 May 2015) was a Turkish politician and military officer, who served as the seventh President of Turkey from 1980 to 1989. He assumed the post by leading the 1980 military coup.

On 18 June 2014, a Turkish court sentenced him to life imprisonment and demotion of his military rank down to private, from army general, for leading the military coup in 1980, obstructing democracy by deposing the prime minister Süleyman Demirel, abolishing the parliament and the senate and abolishing the constitution. This sentence was on appeal at the time of his death.

Biography
Ahmet Kenan Evren was born in Alaşehir, Manisa Province. His father was of Albanian origins. His mother was from a Bulgarian Turkish background. After going to elementary school and middle school in Manisa, Balıkesir and Istanbul, he attended military high school in Maltepe, Ankara. In 1938, he graduated from army school and in 1949 from military academy as a staff officer.

From 1958 to 1959, he served in the Turkish Brigade in Korea. In 1964, he was promoted to general. Evren served at various posts as Army Chief. He was the commander of Operation Gladio's Turkish branch; the Counter-Guerrilla. The Counter-Guerrilla was an anti-communist "stay-behind" guerrilla force set up with the support of NATO. He became Chief of General Staff in March 1978. He was selected by then Prime Minister Bülent Ecevit for not being a member of any political group inside the Turkish Military

1980 military coup d'état

The years leading to the coup were characterized as a fierce struggle between the rightists and leftists. Hoping to see a communist revolution, the left wingers rioted in the streets; on the other hand, the nationalist rightists fought back the left wingers and provoked religious arousal. Universities had taken sides and each became headquarters for either the leftists or rightists.

With the coup came the National Security Council as the ruling body. The council of 1980 was composed of the commanders Kenan Evren, the Chief of Staff and President of the State. The parliament was dissolved. Responding to a journalist's question regarding the execution of Erdal Eren, an alleged 17-year-old but according to official records born in 1961 who was accused of killing a Turkish soldier, he responded "Should we feed him rather than hang him?"

President of Turkey 
After the coup, Kenan Evren was elected as President of Turkey on 7 November 1982 with the 91.37% approval of the new constitution that was submitted to a controversial referendum, replacing the older constitution which, according to him, had liberties too "luxurious" for Turkey.

Evren suspended many forms of civil liberties and human rights on the grounds that it was necessary to establish stability. He professed great admiration for the founder of the Republic of Turkey, Mustafa Kemal Atatürk.

Kenan Evren despite being a staunch defender of Kemalism used a religious rhetoric in his speeches to make his remarks more relatable    

Evren took strong measures to ensure that the division between the political left and right would not turn into violence again; the new constitution limited the rights and depoliticized the youth.

Kenan Evren's junta regime stressed the importance of family planning and passed more liberal laws on abortion

According to a report on the Susurluk scandal of 1996, prepared by Prime Ministry Inspection Board Deputy Chairman Kutlu Savaş, quoted by the Human Rights Foundation of Turkey, "Fascists had been released from prison in return for 'finishing some jobs' under Evren's rule after 12 September 1980".

Concerning Kurds, he denied their existence and claimed the word Kurd comes from the noise that is heard when walking in the snow. Referring to Kurds he used the term Mountain Turk.

Post-presidency 
After his retirement, he moved to the Turkish Mediterranean resort town of Armutalan, Marmaris, and took up painting. 

On 2 August 2006, a reported plan for assassinating Evren was thwarted when two men were apprehended and arrested in Muğla.

A previous attempt in 1996 had already been tracked down when two members of the assassination team spoke on a cellphone eavesdropped by the police, and the Islamic call to prayer (adhan) could be heard during their conversation. Since the timing of the adhan was 4–5 minutes after Istanbul, a point slightly more to the west by that time margin was sought and the team members were caught in Marmaris itself.

In 2004, he revealed that his daughter, Şenay Gürvit, and son-in-law, Erkan Gürvit, are members of the National Intelligence Organization. His daughter presided over the reprisal operations against the militant Armenian organization ASALA.

After Bülent Ecevit's death, he expressed remorse over the arrest of political leaders after the 1980 coup, but defended the coup itself and the 35 executions.

Civilian resentment exists, and there were demands for his being called to account following the Ergenekon investigation.

Trial and conviction
On 10 January 2012, Turkish courts decided to press charges against General Kenan Evren and General Tahsin Şahinkaya, former Commander of the Turkish Air Force, for their role in the 1980 coup. Prosecutors sought life sentences against them. The first court hearing of the case was scheduled for 4 April 2012. Both were sentenced to life imprisonment on 18 June 2014 by a court in Ankara. In accordance with Article 30 of the Military Penal Code, Evren and Şahinkaya were demoted to the lowest rank of private, as the decision was appealed and Evren died before the final decision of the court of appeals, the demotion was not final. On his gravestone he is commemorated as the seventh President of Turkey.

Personal life 
Evren married Sekine Evren in 1944 and they had three daughters, Şenay, Gülay and Miray. Sekine died in 1982.  In 1990, he was awarded the Atatürk International Peace Prize.

Illness and death

Evren was hospitalized for massive gastrointestinal bleeding on 3 August 2009, in Yalıkavak, Bodrum, where his summer house is located. A temporary artificial pacemaker was applied to Evren while in intensive care due to bradycardia. His large intestine was removed a week later at GATA in Istanbul (Gülhane Military Medicine Academy) where he was transferred. He was discharged on 24 September 2009.

Evren died at a military hospital in Ankara on 9 May 2015, aged 97. On 12 May, he was buried in the Turkish State Cemetery in Ankara following the funeral service held at Ahmet Hamdi Akseki Mosque. The funeral was attended by his close relatives and military personnel. In protest, political parties sent no representatives to the former president's funeral. A number of people protested during the religious service in the mosque's courtyard.

References

External links

 

1917 births
2015 deaths
20th-century presidents of Turkey
People from Alaşehir
Presidents of Turkey
Turkish Army generals
Commanders of the Turkish Land Forces
Chiefs of the Turkish General Staff
Leaders who took power by coup
Turkish anti-communists
Operation Gladio
Turkish Military Academy alumni
Army War College (Turkey) alumni
Balıkesir Lisesi alumni
Recipients of the Olympic Order
Turkish people of Albanian descent
Prisoners sentenced to life imprisonment by Turkey
Deaths from gastrointestinal hemorrhage
Burials at Turkish State Cemetery
Heads of government who were later imprisoned